Gerald Leroux (born June 9, 1958) is a Canadian former professional ice hockey player.

During the 1978–79 season, Leroux played ten games in the World Hockey Association with the Indianapolis Racers.

References

External links

1958 births
Living people
Canadian ice hockey left wingers
Flint Generals players
Indianapolis Racers players
Muskegon Mohawks players
Windsor Spitfires players